The 2016 Currie Cup qualification series was a South African rugby union competition organised by the South African Rugby Union which was played between 9 April and 23 July 2016. Nine teams from this competition advanced to the 2016 Currie Cup Premier Division, while the remaining six teams progressed to the 2016 Currie Cup First Division.

Competition rules and information

All fifteen teams in the competition played against each other once over the course of the qualification competition, either at home or away. Teams received four points for a win and two points for a draw. Bonus points were awarded to teams that scored 4 or more tries in a game, as well as to teams that lost a match by 7 points or less. Teams were ranked by log points, then points difference (points scored less points conceded).

The remaining six teams qualified to the 2016 Currie Cup First Division. Points from the qualification stage were not carried over to the second stage.

Teams

The teams that competed in the 2016 Currie Cup qualification competition were:

Team Listing

Log
The final log for the 2016 Currie Cup qualification tournament is:

Round-by-round

The table below shows each team's progression throughout the season. For each round, each team's cumulative points total is shown with the overall log position in brackets.

Matches

The following matches were played in the 2016 Currie Cup qualification series:

Round One

Round Two

Round Three

Round Four

Round Five

Round Six

Round Seven

Round Eight

Round Nine

Round Ten

Round Eleven

Round Twelve

Round Thirteen

Round Fourteen

Round Fifteen

Round Sixteen

Players

Player statistics

The top ten points scorers during the 2016 Currie Cup qualification series were:

Squads

The following squads were named for the 2016 Currie Cup qualification series:

Discipline

The following table contains all the cards handed out during the tournament:

Referees

The following referees officiated matches in the 2016 Currie Cup qualification series:

See also

 2016 Currie Cup Premier Division
 2016 Currie Cup First Division
 2016 Under-21 Provincial Championship
 2016 Under-20 Provincial Championship
 2016 Under-19 Provincial Championship

Notes

References

2016
2016 Currie Cup